Achim Overbeck (born 16 June 1983) is a former German male canoeist who won medals at senior level the Wildwater Canoeing World Championships.

References

External links
 

1983 births
Living people
German male canoeists
Sportspeople from Braunschweig